Saja Records is a LeFrak-Moelis Records subsidiary.

It formerly holds the rights to Jim Croce's ABC-Dunhill releases and currently the rights of Stevie B's recordings before he signed with Empire Musicwerks. It is distributed by Atlantic Records.

In 2012, Saja relinquished the rights of Jim Croce's ABC-Dunhill discography to Disney Music Group of The Walt Disney Company; those albums will be re-issued by Hollywood Records except "I Got a Name", which will be re-released by Walt Disney Records because the title song of the album was featured in the soundtrack of the 2006 film "Invincible". Disney Music Group is currently sister of the American Broadcasting Company, the former parent of ABC-Dunhill, and is distributed by the label's successor company Universal Music Group (which owns Croce's Capitol Records discography outright).

See also
 List of record labels

American record labels